John McMutrie McIntyre (19 October 1898 – 1974) was a Scottish professional footballer who played in the English Football League in England for Derby County and Chesterfield.

References

1898 births
1974 deaths
Footballers from Glasgow
Scottish footballers
Association football wing halves
Stenhousemuir F.C. players
Derby County F.C. players
Chesterfield F.C. players
English Football League players
Glasgow Perthshire F.C. players